This is a list of the 163 resident embassies in London. For other diplomatic missions in the United Kingdom, see List of diplomatic missions in the United Kingdom.

Embassies and High Commissions in London

British Overseas Territories

Consulates-General in London

Other missions or delegations in London

Official Residences

See also
Ambassadors of the United Kingdom
Diplomatic missions of the United Kingdom
Foreign policy of the United Kingdom
List of diplomatic missions in the United Kingdom
Taipei Representative Office in the UK
Hong Kong Economic and Trade Office

References

External links
Foreign Embassies and consulates in London
Foreign & Commonwealth Office Diplomatic List

 
United Kingdom
Diplomatic missions
London-related lists